The Keep is a limited series written by American author F. Paul Wilson and drawn by Matthew Dow Smith, published by IDW Publishing

It is based on F. Paul Wilson's novel The Keep. In the foreword to this work F. Paul Wilson answers the question of exactly why he scripted a graphic novel version: "Because I consider this visual presentation of THE KEEP my version of the movie, what could have been...what should have been."

Plot summary

The Keep had stood empty in the Transylvanian Alps for some 500 years. No one knew who built it, or why. But on the eve of World War II, German soldiers moved in and awoke something—something hungry... something more merciless than the SS einsatzkommandos accompanying them.

See also
List of comics based on fiction

References

External links
IDW's profile
Comic Book Daily review by Scott VanderPloeg

Comic book limited series
Comics based on novels
IDW Publishing titles